Twilight on the Trail is a 1941 American Western film directed by Howard Bretherton, written by J. Benton Cheney, Ellen Corby and Cecile Kramer, and starring William Boyd, Andy Clyde, Brad King, Wanda McKay, Jack Rockwell, Norman Willis and Robert Kent. It was released on September 29, 1941, by Paramount Pictures.

Plot

Cast 
William Boyd as Hopalong Cassidy
Andy Clyde as California Carlson
Brad King as Johnny Nelson
Wanda McKay as Lucy Brent
Jack Rockwell as Jim Brent
Norman Willis as Nat Kervy
Robert Kent as Ash Drake
Tom London as Tim Gregg
Frank Austin as Steve Farley

References

External links 
 

1941 films
American black-and-white films
Paramount Pictures films
American Western (genre) films
1941 Western (genre) films
Films directed by Howard Bretherton
Hopalong Cassidy films
1940s English-language films
1940s American films